Samuel August from Sevedstorp and Hanna i Hult (Swedish: Samuel August från Sevedstorp och Hanna i Hult) is a book by Astrid Lindgren and deals with the love story of her parents Samuel August Erikson and Hanna Jonsson.

Plot 
At the age of thirteen Samuel August falls in love with the nine-year-old Hanna. Soon Samuel August leaves school and does not see Hannah again for quite a while. Until he is eighteen, Samuel August is working as a farmhand. But one day the vicarage Näs near Vimmerby is offered for lease and Samuel August becomes the new tenant of the vicarage. Over the next few years, Samuel rarely meets Hanna. At the age of 25, Samuel August watches Hanna at a festival. But he doesn't dare to speak to her. So many men are interested in Hanna and Samuel August doesn't believe that she would choose him. At a wedding, Hanna realizes that Samuel August is in love with her and invites Samuel August to go for a walk with her. Hanna promises to stitch a monogram on Samuels hat. After a few months have passed and Samuel August has not seen Hanna, Samuel August writes a letter to Hanna. Hanna replies, and they exchange letters until Samuel August unexpectedly meets Hanna again in Vimmerby and drinks tea with her. Later he asks Hanna if they could live together. Hanna replies that the two of them cannot decide this on their own, but at least she gives Samuel August the first kiss. Hanna hesitates a little before the wedding takes place on June 30, 1905. When Samuel August brings his wife to Näs a fortnight later, they are living there together for another 56 years. As long as he is alive, Samuel August mentions daily how much he loves his Hanna.

Contents

Overview 
The book is about the love story of Astrid Lindgren's parents. In Sweden, the book was first published in 1975 by Rabén & Sjögren. It was titled Samuel August från Sevedstorp och Hanna i Hult. Later an audiobook was released which was read by the author Astrid Lindgren. The book has been translated into many languages, including German. Three of the essays from the book Samuel August from Sevedstorp and Hanna i Hult have also been translated into English. Samuel August from Sevedstorp and Hanna i Hult has been translated by Marlaine Delargy. The English version was published by the Swedish Book Review in their 2nd edition of their magazine in 2007. I remember... (Minnes...) was translated by Patricia Crampton and first published in 1988 in the journal Signal: Approaches to Children's Books (57). Short Talk with a Prospective Children’s Writer (Litet samtal med en blivande barnboksförfattare) was translated by Roger G. Tanner. It was first published in June 1973 in The Horn Book Magazine.

In 1999 the book was chosen as the love story of the century in Sweden.

Next to the Love story Samuel August from Sevedstorp and Hanna i Hult the Swedish Edition also includes a few other essays, for example Det började i Kristins kök, in which Astrid Lindgren writes about her neighbour Kristin who read the first books to her and made Astrid Lindgren become interested in literature. In another chapter Minnes.... (Let us remember) Lindgren is talking about her childhood, inspired by a poem from Harry Martinson.

In 2015, in Sweden the essay Luise Justine Mejer : en kärlekshistoria från 1700-talets Tyskland was released as a book on its own by Novelix. It is about the German book Ich war wohl klug, daß ich dich fand, which contains letters of Luise Mejer and Heinrich Christian Boie. Astrid Lindgren originally got the book from her German friend Luise Hartung and was impressed by the love story.

Editions 
 Samuel August från Sevedstorp och Hanna i Hult (1975), Swedish Edition
 Das entschwundene Land (1977), Oetinger Verlag, German Edition
 Samuel August from Sevedstorp and Hanna from Hult (2007), In: Swedish Book Review: 2007:2 Issue P. 6-12, English Edition
 I remember... (1988), In: Signal: Approaches to Children's Books (57), P. 155–169, English Edition
 I remember... (2002), In: Swedish Book Review: 2002:1 Issue P. 13–19, English Edition
 Short Talk with a Prospective Children's Writer (1973), In: The Horn Book Magazine, Edition of June 1973, English Edition

External links 
 Samuel August from Sevedstorp and Hanna i Hult (abridged English version) by the Swedish Book Review
 Short Talk with a Prospective Children’s Writer in The Horn Book Magazine.

References

1975 Swedish novels
Novels by Astrid Lindgren
Swedish-language novels
Novels set in Småland